Women's downhill skiing events at the 2006 Winter Paralympics were contested at Sestriere on 11 and 12 March.

There were three events. Each was contested by skiers from a range of disability classes, and the standings were decided by applying a disability factor to the actual times achieved.

Visually impaired
The visually impaired event took place on 12 March. It was won by Pascale Casanova, representing .

Sitting
The sitting event took place on 12 March. It was won by Laurie Stephens, representing .

Standing
The standing event took place on 11 March. It was won by Solène Jambaqué, representing .

References

W
Para